Labeobarbus jubae is a species of ray-finned fish in the genus Labeobarbus which is endemic to Ethiopia.

References 

 

jubae
Taxa named by Keith Edward Banister
Fish described in 1984